Sena V was King of Anuradhapura in the 10th century, whose reign lasted from 991 to 1001. He succeeded his father Mahinda IV as King of Anuradhapura and was succeeded by his brother Mahinda V.

See also
 List of Sri Lankan monarchs
 History of Sri Lanka

References

External links
 Kings & Rulers of Sri Lanka
 Codrington's Short History of Ceylon

Monarchs of Anuradhapura
S
S
S
S